Kotagiri is a village in Nizamabad district in the state of Telangana in India. it is an ancient village ruled by kakatiyas near to bodhan

References 

Villages in Nizamabad district